Ben Shemen (lit. very fruitful) is a moshav in central Israel. Located around four kilometres east of Lod, it falls under the jurisdiction of Hevel Modi'in Regional Council.

Etymology
The village's name is taken from Isaiah 5:1:

Let me sing of my well-beloved, a song of my beloved touching his vineyard. My well-beloved had a vineyard in a very fruitful hill.

and also reflects the JNF's planting of olive trees in this area.

History
The moshav was founded in 1905 on the land of the former Arab estate of Bayt ‘Arīf. It and was one of the first villages established on Jewish National Fund land. The first Jewish National Fund forest is also located in Ben Shemen.  In 1910 Ben Shemen was the site of the Bezalel Artists' Colony (1910), a predecessor to the Ben Shemen youth village. 
According to a census conducted in 1922 by the British Mandate authorities, Ben Shemen had a population of 90 Jews. Which had increased in the 1931 census to 353 residents, in 30 houses.
In 1923 it was split in two, with a group of trial farms eventually becoming a separate moshav, Kerem Ben Shemen.

The Ben Shemen Youth Village was established adjacent to the moshav in 1927 and is today a large agricultural boarding school. In 1945, the lands of Ben Shemen amounted to 2,176 dunams, of which 607 dunams were devoted to orchards, 947 dunams to field crops, one dunam for bananas, and 594 dunams were left uncultivated. According to Marom, "Citrus growing remained undeveloped in Ben Shemen, with the youth village specializing in orchards and field crops".

During World War II, Ben Shemen was the site of a British search for weapons. Similar searches were a common British response to Jewish opposition to the White Paper of 1939. In 1947 Ben Shemen had a population of 75.  The village experienced extensive damage during the early days of the 1948 Arab–Israeli war and had to be reconstructed. Immigrants from Romania joined the moshav in 1952. Some houses were built by Bezalel Academy of Art and Design founder Boris Schatz.

Archaeology 
During road-work near Ben Shemen in 1975, a burial cave containing three ossuaries was found. An Aramaic funerary inscription on one of them mentions "Levi son of Menashe" and is dated to the late Second Temple period, probably during the first century BCE or CE.

Additionally, a boulder that collapsed from the cave wall had a Greek funerary inscription written in red, which according to its style, was probably inscribed during the 2nd or 3rd centuries CE. Di Segni suggests that the Hebrew name "Yo'ezer" on the inscription indicates that the area had not been completely cleared of Jews after the Jewish-Roman Wars. Jews who did not participate in the revolt may have survived in the area, converting to Christianity and preserving the family name for generations to come. Others have argued that, despite its rarity, a Christian usage of an Old Testament name doesn't require additional explanation.

Notable residents
Benjamin Elazari Volcani
Aharon Yadlin
Shimon Peres

See also
Ben Shemen Interchange

References

External links
Ben Shemen, Cross-Israel Highway: Reproduction of an oil press Israel Antiquities Authority

Moshavim
Populated places established in 1905
1905 establishments in the Ottoman Empire
Jewish villages in the Ottoman Empire
Jewish villages in Mandatory Palestine
Populated places in Central District (Israel)
Romanian-Jewish culture in Israel